Nizhnyaya Suyetka is a rural locality (a selo) and the administrative center of Nizhnesuyetsky Selsoviet, Suyetsky District, Altai Krai, Russia. The population was 907 as of 2013. There are 16 streets.

Geography 
Nizhnyaya Suyetka is located 14 km southwest of Verkh-Suyetka (the district's administrative centre) by road. Sibirsky Gigant is the nearest rural locality.

References 

Rural localities in Suyetsky District